The Swedish Squash Federation is the national organisation for squash in Sweden. It divides the country into five districts. The organisation was founded in 1965 and is headquartered in Malmö. The chairman is Björn Strandberg (since 2013). Current u19 Champion is Tor Christoffersen (Malmö).

See also
 Sweden men's national squash team

External links
 Official site

Squash
National members of the World Squash Federation
Sports organizations established in 1965
1965 establishments in Sweden
Squash in Sweden